Neufville is a surname. Notable people with this surname include:

 Eddie Neufville (born 1976), Liberian sprinter
 Edward Neufville Tailer (1830–1917), American merchant
 Georg von Neufville (1883–1941), German Wehrmacht officer
 Jean de Neufville (1729–1796), Dutch banker
 Josh Neufville (born 2001), English football player
 Leendert Pieter de Neufville (1729–1811), Dutch merchant
 Marilyn Neufville (born 1952), Jamaican sprinter
 Neufville de Villeroy family
 Camille (1606–1693), French archbishop
 François (1644–1730), French military leader and nobleman
 François Paul (1677–1731), French archbishop
 Nicolas IV (1543–1617), French politician and nobleman
 Nicolas V (1598–1685), French military leader and nobleman
 Renee Neufville, American singer, member of Zhané
 Vashon Neufville (born 1999), English football player

See also
 Neufville Typefoundry, in Barcelona, Spain
 Neufvilles